Eugen Moldovan (born 5 November 1961 in Braşov), also known as Ojine Moldovane in Morocco, is a Romanian football manager who last managed Racing Beirut in Lebanon. He has coached several clubs in the Arabic countries, including Lebanon, Oman, Saudi Arabia, Kuwait, Jordan and Morocco, where he became a favorite at Hassania Agadir. Between 2001 and 2002, he was manager of the Congo national football team.

Honours

Managerial
Sagesse
Lebanese Premier League runner-up: 2000–01

Al-Seeb 
Sultan Qaboos Cup runner-up: 2003
Oman Super Cup runner-up: 2004

Hassania Agadir
Moroccan Cup runner-up: 2005–06

References

External links
Eugen Moldovan şi-a stabilit cartierul general în ţările arabe 
Eugen Moldovan interview Hassania Agadir 2009 
Le Hassania retrouve la compétition 43 ans après 
33 entraîneurs candidats sélectionneurs des Léopards football A 
Ligue arabe des champions : le Hassania d’Agadir se déplace en Jordanie 
Moldovan, de retour au Hassania d’Agadir 
مالدوفان يقود تدريبات الساحل ويختبر ثلاثة مغاربة 
 
 

1961 births
Living people
FC Brașov (1936) players
Romanian footballers
Sportspeople from Brașov
Romanian football managers
Romanian expatriate football managers
Hassania Agadir managers
Expatriate footballers in Lebanon
Lebanese Premier League players
Sagesse SC footballers
Expatriate football managers in the Republic of the Congo
Congo national football team managers
Expatriate football managers in Oman
Expatriate football managers in Lebanon
Expatriate football managers in Morocco
Expatriate football managers in Kuwait
Expatriate football managers in Jordan
Expatriate football managers in Saudi Arabia
Romanian expatriate sportspeople in Lebanon
Romanian expatriate sportspeople in Morocco
Al-Wehda Club (Mecca) managers
Association football defenders
COD Meknès managers
Ittihad Khemisset managers
Sagesse SC football managers
Al-Sahel SC (Kuwait) managers